Notocochlis dillwynii is a species of predatory sea snail, a marine gastropod mollusk in the family Naticidae, the moon snails.

Description

Distribution
This marine species occurs in European waters, the Atlantic Ocean off the Cape Verdes and the Canary Islands; in the Mediterranean Sea.

References

 Huelsken T., Marek K., Schreiber S., Schmidt I. & Hollmann M. (2008). The Naticidae (Mollusca: Gastropoda) of Giglio Island (Tuscany, Italy): Shell characters, live animals, and a molecular analysis of egg masses. Zootaxa 1770: 1-40

dillwynii
Molluscs of the Atlantic Ocean
Molluscs of the Mediterranean Sea
Molluscs of the Canary Islands
Gastropods of Cape Verde
Gastropods described in 1826